Dorcadion eugeniae is a species of beetle in the family Cerambycidae. It was described by Ludwig Ganglbauer in 1885. It is known from Greece.

Subspecies
 Dorcadion eugeniae emgei Ganglbauer, 1885
 Dorcadion eugeniae eugeniae Ganglbauer, 1885

References

eugeniae
Beetles described in 1885